Lieps is a lake in Mecklenburg-Vorpommern, Germany. At an elevation of 14.8 m, its surface area is 4.31 km².

External links 
 

Lakes of Mecklenburg-Western Pomerania
Neubrandenburg
LLieps